St Anne's Church, Whitstone is a Grade I listed parish church in the Church of England Diocese of Truro in Whitstone, Cornwall, England, UK.

History

The church dates from the 13th century. the upper part of the tower and the arcades are 15th century. The chancel, porch and interior were rebuilt in 1882 by Samuel Hooper of Hatherleigh. The renovation of the windows, with the addition of new windows was executed by Messrs Beer and Driffield of Exeter. The restoration cost £2,000.

Parish status
The church is in a joint parish with
St Gregory's Church, Treneglos
St Werburgh's Church, Warbstow
St Winwaloe's Church, Poundstock
Our Lady and St Anne's Church, Widemouth Bay
St Gennys’ Church, St Gennys
St James' Church, Jacobstow
St Mary the Virgin's Church, Week St Mary

Organ

A new organ was presented in 1880 by Edward Mucklow of Bennets in the parish.

Bells

The 3 medieval bells were expanded to 4 in the 18th century. In 1831 the tenor was recast by Mears of the Whitechapel Bell Foundry. In 1885 two additional trebles were cast by Llewellyn and James of Bristol, and the tenor was recast by John Warner & Sons of Cripplegate Foundry, to bring the ring up to 6.

References

Whitstone
Whitstone